Dalibor Markovic (born 17 January 2002), is an Australian professional soccer player who currently played as a left back for Preston Lions.

Club career

Melbourne Victory
On 24 February 2021, Markovic made his debut in the A-League against Wellington Phoenix in a 2–0 win by finishing the full 90 minutes and was impressed by head coach Grant Brebner.

Western United
It was announced on 12 April 2021 that Markovic will switch Victorian clubs to join Melbourne Victory's cross-town rivals Western United. In an interview with A-League Access, Markovic stated that his move to Western United was due to uncertainty with an expected club restructure. Furthermore, he stated that his move was "best for [his] development". Two weeks later, he made his Western United debut in a 2–0 home win against Newcastle Jets.

Personal life
Dalibor's father played for FK Partizan Belgrade as a goalkeeper.

Career statistics

Club

International

Notes

References

External links

2002 births
Living people
Australian soccer players
Association football forwards
Western United FC players
Melbourne Victory FC players
A-League Men players
Preston Lions FC players
National Premier Leagues players
Australian people of Serbian descent